The following lists events that happened in 1995 in Libya.

Incumbents
President: Muammar al-Gaddafi
Prime Minister: Abdul Majid al-Qa′ud

Events
1995–96 Libyan Premier League

 
Years of the 20th century in Libya
Libya
Libya
1990s in Libya